The Wake is a 2014 debut novel by British author Paul Kingsnorth. Written in an "imaginary language", a kind of hybrid between Old English and Modern English, it tells of "Buccmaster of Holland", an Anglo-Saxon freeman forced to come to terms with the effects of the Norman Invasion of 1066, during which his wife and sons were killed. He begins a guerrilla war against the Norman invaders in the Lincolnshire Fens.

Kingsnorth financed the work through crowdfunding on the platform Unbound after he did not receive support through a mainstream publisher, and he did not initially expect a large response to his work. However, the book was longlisted for the 2014 Man Booker Prize and won the 2014 Gordon Burn Prize. The film rights were acquired by actor and director Mark Rylance, and he read a section of the book in 2014 at the Hay Festival.

See also
 Anglish

References

2014 British novels
Books written in fictional dialects
Novels set in Anglo-Saxon England
Novels set in the 11th century
Crowdfunded books
2014 debut novels